Johnnie Bobby Jackson (born January 11, 1967) is a former professional American football cornerback in the National Football League (NFL). He attended Harlingen (Texas) High School from 1981 to 1985 and played quarterback. He played four seasons with the San Francisco 49ers (1989–1992) and the Green Bay Packers (1992).

References

1967 births
Living people
Players of American football from Houston
American football cornerbacks
Houston Cougars football players
San Francisco 49ers players
Green Bay Packers players